James Walter Kehoe (April 25, 1870 – August 20, 1938) was a U.S. Representative from Florida for one term from 1917 to 1919.

Early life and education
Born in Eufaula, Alabama, Kehoe attended the common schools.
He moved to Florida in 1883.
He studied law.
He was admitted to the bar in 1889 and, being a minor, was authorized by a special act of the State legislature to commence practice in Milton, Florida.

Political career

State legislature
He served as a member of the State house of representatives in 1900 but resigned before the legislature convened.
He served as a member of the Democratic congressional executive committee.
State's attorney for the first judicial circuit of Florida 1900-1909.

Congress
Kehoe was elected as a Democrat to the Sixty-fifth Congress (March 4, 1917 – March 3, 1919).
He was an unsuccessful candidate for reelection to the Sixty-sixth Congress in 1918.
Again State's attorney from June 1925 until March 1926, when he resigned.
He resumed the practice of law in Miami, Florida.

Death
He died in Coral Gables, Florida, on August 20, 1938.
He was interred in Graceland Park Cemetery, Miami, Florida.

References

1870 births
1938 deaths
Democratic Party members of the United States House of Representatives from Florida
People from Eufaula, Alabama
People from Milton, Florida